RedBalloon is an experiential gifts company.

History
RedBalloon was founded in 2001 by Naomi Simson. Simson began the company out of her house with a $25,000 personal investment.  She grew the company  to forty six employees by 2011. The business concept was to sell experiences and memories rather than gifts. Simson launched the company from her home in Balmain, New South Wales. It was at the end of the dot-com era and she had a difficult time signing up businesses to list with the company. It was a total of two months and four days before the company sold its first experience gift, which resulted in a profit of $9 for commission on the sale.

The company began to grow six months after pop when it was contacted by Fuji Xerox about using the experiences available on the website as an incentive for its sales force. Companies such as Telstra,  Westpac, Commonwealth Bank, and Qantas signed up shortly thereafter. The success of  using the experiences for incentives led the company to create RedBalloon Corporate in 2004. From 2001 through 2012, it was reported that the company sold more than 1.7 million gift experiences. The company also reported a 40% growth in their 2012 financial year for overall transaction values. The company also sells experience gift cards in offline retailers such as Target, Big W, and Myer.

The company migrated its online infrastructure to cloud-based Amazon Web Services in 2013. The move was to manage peak traffic load which included $1Million in sales on Christmas Eve 2012. Prior to that time, the company used caching and had extra servers on standby to deal with peak loads of traffic to the site. The company also made its first external board appointments in 2013 when it appointed Richard England as chairman of the board and Scott Farquhar as a non-executive director.

Naomi Simson was CEO of the company until 2011 when she took a step back from the operational side of the business. In October 2013 RedBalloon delivered its two millionth experience. In 2015, Nick Baker was hired as CEO of the company and Ken Boundy became chairman of the board. RedBalloon went through a re-branding in late 2015, updating the company logo and website. David Anderson took over as CEO in 2017 after becoming the CEO of the newly formed Big Red Group, a holding company that became the parent of RedBalloon. Anderson purchased 50% of Redballoon in 2017.

RedBalloon was fined $43,000 in 2017 by the Australian Competition & Consumer Commission after an investigation found they charged four consumers excessive payment surcharges.

Awards and recognition
RedBalloon's awards and recognition include being named one of The Great Places to Work by Business Review Weekly from 2009 to 2013 and receiving recognition on the BRW Fast 100 list from 2004 to 2009. The company has also been a regular on the Deloitte Fast 50 for Australia, beginning in 2006. In 2015 it became the first Australian company to be named on the WorldBlu list of Most Freedom-Centered Workplaces.

See also
 Experiential gifts

There is also RedBaloon, https://www.redballoon.work

References

External links
 RedBalloon Official Website

Retail companies established in 2001
Companies based in Sydney
Online retailers of Australia
Giving